Aurasma was Autonomy's augmented reality platform.  It was available as a software development kit or as a free app for iOS and Android-based mobile devices. Aurasma's image recognition technology used a smartphone's or tablet's camera to recognize real world images, augmenting physical content with animations, videos, 3D models and/or web pages. It was renamed to HP Reveal after purchase by HP in October 2011.

History

Aurasma's augmented reality technology was created in Cambridge, England, by the software company Autonomy, and first demonstrated publicly by Matt Mills in early 2011 at the MipTV Media Market in Cannes, France. On May 5, 2011 "Aurasma Lite" was launched as an application for iPhone, and a version for Android followed on June 10, 2011. In addition to Aurasma's own mobile app, the technology has also been integrated into of other smartphone and tablet applications, the first being created for the 2011 J. J. Abrams film Super 8. In December 2012, the Aurasma mobile app was updated and "Lite" was dropped from its name. 

In October 2011, Aurasma was acquired by Hewlett-Packard Enterprise. During this time, Annie Weinberger worked as the company's general manager. The app, now under HP Autonomy, was renamed to "HP Reveal." In addition to Aurasma's original content, the company provided white-collar applications, software development kits, and AR campaign tools. Though the name was changed to HP Reveal, a web-based service called "Aurasma Studio" was still available for users to create "auras". 

In September 2017, Hewlett-Packard sold Autonomy to Micro Focus, with Micro Focus attempting to merge with HP Autonomy. However, HP Reveal was discontinued by Hewlett-Packard in February 2020.

Industry awards and views
In 2011, Aurasma presented by Matt Mills won DEMO's "DEMOgod" and "People's Choice" awards. At the Consumer Electronics Show in Las Vegas, Nevada in 2012, Aurasma won CNET's "Best of CES Finalist" award. At the 2012 AR Summit Awards, Aurasma won two awards: "Best AR App" and "Best Overall AR." At the 2012 International Brand Video Awards, Aurasma won the "Award for Technical Innovation". Aurasma-powered apps also earned some awards, including Marvel's win of the 2012 Mobile Excellence Award "Best App for Entertainment" for its Marvel AR mobile app.

In 2013 Jonathan Margolis of the Financial Times described Aurasma as "ambitious but staggeringly useless".

References

External links

Augmented reality